Huron Heights Secondary School is a high school in Kitchener, Ontario, Canada. As of the 2019–2020 school year, 1,600 students attend the school. It is located at 1825 Strasbourg Road, on the intersection between Strasburg and Huron Road. The school opened on September 5, 2006. Its student body and its sports teams are known as the Huskies.

History 

New students were introduced gradually. The first year; only grades 9 and 10 attended, and grades 11 and 12 were added each successive year of operation. A Developmental Education class was added in 2007. The fall of 2009 saw the inaugural grade 12 graduation ceremony for the initial grade 10 students who opened the school.

As of February 2019, the school has become overcrowded. The school has over 12 portables, and is continuing to add more. The lunch period was split into two to reduce crowds, and classes are overcrowded, including science labs, and gyms.

Academics 
The school offers four Specialist High Skills Major (SHSM) programs, which are Arts and Culture, Environment, Health and Wellness, and Sport.

Achievement 
In the 2018–2019 school year, 74% of students passed Ontario's Literacy Test on their first attempt, as compared to the provincial average of 80%. In the same year, 88% of Grade 9 Academic Math students achieved the provincial standard, (as compared to 84% throughout the province) and 59% of Grade 9 Applied Math students achieved the provincial standard, (as compared to 44% throughout the province).

See also 
 List of Waterloo Region, Ontario schools
List of high schools in Ontario

References

External links 
  School Home Page

Waterloo Region District School Board
High schools in the Regional Municipality of Waterloo
Educational institutions established in 2006
Schools in Kitchener, Ontario
2006 establishments in Ontario